Li Jun or Jun Li may refer to:

Emperor Suzong of Tang (711–762), personal name Li Jun, emperor of the Tang dynasty
Li Jun (politician) (born 1962), Chinese politician, deputy party chief of Hainan
Li Jun (general) (李军; born 1963), Chinese general, chief of staff of the PLA Rocket Force
Jun Li (director) (born 1991), director of the 2021 film Drifting
Li Jun Li, American actress
Jun Li (mathematician), Chinese mathematician
Baoshu (born 1980), born Li Jun, Chinese science fiction writer
Li Jun (Water Margin), fictional character from the novel Water Margin

Sportspeople
Li Jun (table tennis) (born 1967), Chinese-Japanese table tennis player
Li Jun (water polo) (born 1980), Chinese water polo player
Li Jun (sport shooter) (born 1985), Chinese sport shooter